Prakash Amritraj and Rajeev Ram were the defending champions, but they chose not to participate this year.
Scott Lipsky and David Martin won in the final 7–6(9–7), 6–3 against Vasek Pospisil and Adil Shamasdin.

Seeds 

  Scott Lipsky /  David Martin (champions)
  Treat Conrad Huey /  Harsh Mankad (quarterfinals)
  Lester Cook /  Travis Rettenmaier (first round)
  Bobby Reynolds /  Ryan Sweeting (first round)

Draw

Draw

External links
 Main Draw
 Qualifying Draw

Challenger of Dallas - Doubles
2010 Doubles